Paul Curran (born 1964) is a Scottish opera director. He was General Manager (Artistic Director) of the opera company of the Norwegian National Opera and Ballet (2007–2011), and artistic consultant to Central City Opera of Denver, Colorado.

Early life
Curran was born in Maryhill, Glasgow. At the age of five, he was rehoused with his family to Easterhouse. He played clarinet in the Glasgow Schools Orchestra, and saw his first opera (Scottish Opera's production of Wozzeck) in 1980.

The following year, his parents discovered that he was gay and threw him out. He went to London, where he trained as a ballet dancer at the London Studio Centre and the Central School of Ballet before studying with Sulamith Messerer. He worked for a time as an usher at English National Opera during the period when Lord Harewood, Mark Elder and David Pountney formed the artistic management of the company.

Curran spent two years at the ballet school of the Finnish National Opera and then three years as a professional dancer with Scottish Ballet and in Germany. A hip injury terminated his ballet career, and he worked as an interpreter and stage manager before, at the age of twenty-seven, entering the National Institute of Dramatic Art in Sydney to study directing.

Career in opera
After graduating, Curran worked for two years as an assistant to Baz Luhrmann on his production of Benjamin Britten's A Midsummer Night's Dream which visited the Edinburgh International Festival in 1994. As well as taking over responsibility for reviving this production, he assisted on other productions and worked as an interpreter. In the latter capacity, he encountered Valery Gergiev when the Kirov Opera visited Edinburgh in 1995, and was engaged to restage Prince Igor for a gala performance in the Royal Albert Hall. In the same year, he made his debut as an independent freelance opera director with an open-air Magic Flute for Bloomsbury Opera.

Curran's subsequent opera productions have included:

Ariadne auf Naxos, La Fenice, Venice, 2002
Billy Budd, Santa Fe Opera, 2008
La bohème, Santa Fe, 2007
La Cenerentola, Teatro di San Carlo, Naples, 2003
Daphne, Venice, 2005
Death in Venice, Garsington Opera, 2015
Eva (Josef Bohuslav Foerster), Wexford Festival Opera, 2004
La donna del lago, Santa Fe, 2013
Faramondo, for Göttingen International Handel Festival (2014) and Brisbane Baroque (2015)
La finta giardiniera, Garsington Opera, 2003
Die Frau ohne Schatten, Lyric Opera of Chicago, 2007
I gioielli della Madonna, University College Opera, 2000
Hamlet, designed by Vivienne Westwood, for the Clerkenwell Music Series
Königskinder, Naples, 2002
Kullervo (Aulis Sallinen), University College Opera, 2001 (British premiere)
Lady Macbeth of Mtsensk, Canadian Opera Company, Toronto, 2007
I Lombardi, Florence, 2005
Lucia di Lammermoor, Halle, 2006
A Midsummer Night's Dream (conducted by Steuart Bedford and designed by Curran), Naples, 2000
Mirandolina (Bohuslav Martinů), Wexford, 2002
Otello, Teatro Lirico Giuseppe Verdi, Trieste, 2001
Otello, Welsh National Opera, 2008
Peter Grimes, Trieste, 2002
Peter Grimes, Santa Fe, with Anthony Dean Griffey and Christine Brewer, 2005
Schwanda the Bagpiper, Augsburg, 2007
The Rape of Lucretia, Central City Opera, near Denver, 2008
The Tales of Hoffmann, Central City Opera, 2004
Tannhäuser, La Scala, Milan, 2005
Tosca, Mariinsky Theatre, Saint Petersburg, 2007
Tosca, Toronto, 2007
Il trovatore, Teatro Communale, Bologna, 2005
The Tsar's Bride, The Royal Opera, Covent Garden, 2011

Curran has also directed the musicals Man of La Mancha and A Funny Thing Happened on the Way to the Forum for the Covent Garden Festival.

Forthcoming productions include Lulu for Chicago, Il trovatore for Bilbao, I puritani in Bologna and Peter Grimes in Oslo and at Washington National Opera.

References
Notes

Sources
 
 Wexford Festival Opera, programme books for 2002 and 2004

External links 
 Paul Curran Operabase

1965 births
Living people
People from Maryhill
Scottish gay artists
Scottish male ballet dancers
Scottish theatre directors
British opera directors
National Institute of Dramatic Art alumni
LGBT theatre directors
Gay dancers
Dancers of the Scottish Ballet
Helpmann Award winners
20th-century Scottish LGBT people
21st-century Scottish LGBT people